Scotland Yard, officially New Scotland Yard, is the headquarters of the Metropolitan Police Service, responsible for policing Greater London.

Scotland Yard may also refer to:

Places
 Great Scotland Yard, the street where the original (now demolished) head office of the Metropolitan Police was located 
 Norman Shaw Buildings, its replacement, the original New Scotland Yard, on the Victoria Embankment
 Scotland Yard (Highland Park), a baseball park located in Highland Park, Texas
 New Scotland Yard (building), a building in Westminster, London

Art, entertainment and media
 Scotland Yard, 1929 play by Denison Clift, adapted into two films
 Scotland Yard (1930 film), starring Joan Bennett
 Scotland Yard (1941 film), a 1941 American crime drama film
 Scotland Yard (film series), a series of British cinema film shorts (1953–61)
 Scotland Yard (TV series), a 1960 British crime series 
 Scotland Yard (board game), 1983
 "Scotland Yard", a John Cale song from Shifty Adventures in Nookie Wood
 New Scotland Yard (TV series), a British crime series which ran from 1972–1974